Sâmia de Souza Bomfim (born 22 August 1989) is a Brazilian politician. She has spent her political career representing São Paulo, having served as federal deputy representative since 2019.

Personal life
Prior to entering politics Bomfim worked as a civil servant. She identifies as a feminist. She cites her inspirations as fellow PSOL politicians and activists Marielle Franco and Jean Wyllys. She is also inspired by her close friend Vinicius Luz. Bomfim is considered a supporter of LGBT rights and took part in the 2019 São Paulo Pride parade.

In 2016 Bomfim participated protests demanding the resignation of Eduardo Cunha and protesting rape culture in Brazil.

In January 2020, Bomfim publicly announced that she was in a relationship with Glauber Braga, federal deputy for the PSOL of Rio de Janeiro. In December 2020, Bomfim announced she was pregnant with the couples' first child, Hugo. In January 2020, she announced a relationship with Glauber Braga, a federal deputy for Rio's PSOL. In June 2021, Hugo, the couple's first child, was born.

Political career
Bomfim is the youngest woman ever elected to the Municipal Chamber of São Paulo, at the age of 27, and the first woman to be directly elected to the federal Chamber of Deputies for the Socialism and Liberty Party. In the 2018 general election, Bomfin was one of the most voted candidates with 249,887 votes, being elected to the federal Chamber of Deputies.

References

1989 births
Living people
People from Presidente Prudente, São Paulo
Brazilian feminists
Brazilian LGBT rights activists
Socialism and Liberty Party politicians
Members of the Chamber of Deputies (Brazil) from São Paulo
Members of the Legislative Assembly of São Paulo
Brazilian women in politics